The 1973 European Cup final was a football match held at the Red Star Stadium, Belgrade, on 30 May 1973, in which Ajax of the Netherlands defeated Juventus of Italy 1–0. A goal from Johnny Rep four minutes into the match was enough for Ajax to claim their third consecutive European Cup. This victory meant that Ajax had earned the privilege of keeping the trophy permanently.

Route to the final

Match

Details

See also
1972–73 European Cup
1996 UEFA Champions League final – contested by the same teams
AFC Ajax in European football
Juventus F.C. in European football
1972–73 Juventus F.C. season

Notes

References

External links
1972-73 season at UEFA website

1
European Cup Final 1973
European Cup Final 1973
Euro
Euro
1973
International club association football competitions hosted by Yugoslavia
May 1973 sports events in Europe
1970s in Belgrade
1973 in Serbia
Football in Belgrade
International sports competitions in Belgrade